Plympton Hundred was the name of one of thirty two ancient administrative units of Devon, England.

The parishes in the hundred were: 
Brixton, Plympton St Mary, Plympton St Maurice, Plymstock, Revelstoke, Shaugh Prior, Wembury and Yealmpton

See also 
 List of hundreds of England and Wales - Devon

References 

Hundreds of Devon